Magüi Serna was the defending champion, but did not compete this year.

Émilie Loit won the title by defeating Iveta Benešová 7–5, 7–6(7–1) in the final. It was the 2nd title in the year for Loit and the 8th title in her singles career.

Seeds

Draw

Finals

Top half

Bottom half

References
 Main and Qualifying Rounds

2004 Women's Singles
Singles
Estoril Open